Best of Puddle of Mudd is the first "best of" collection from the band Puddle of Mudd. It was released on November 2, 2010 as part of Universal Music Enterprises's "Icon" Series of Compilation Albums. It contains tracks from their first four major label albums, plus "Bleed" from The Punisher soundtrack.

Track listing

References

External links
Official website
Record Label website
Official RSS Feed
Puddle of Mudd at MySpace.com
Puddle of Mudd on Demand

2010 compilation albums
Puddle of Mudd albums
Geffen Records albums